Christo is both a given name and surname. Notable people with the name include:

Given name

 Christo (1935–2020), Bulgarian environmental artist
 Christo Albertyn Smith (1898-1956), South African botanist
 Christo Bilukidi (born 1989), Angolan-Canadian NFL defensive end
 Christo Botma (born 1991), South African-born Danish cricketer
 Christo Cave (born 1961), Trinidad and Tobago chess player
 Christo Christov (1926–2007) was a Bulgarian film director and screenwriter
 Christo Coetzee (1929–2000), South African assemblage and Neo-Baroque artist
 Christo du Plessis (born 1989), South African rugby union player
 Christo Hall (born 1978) Australian entrepreneur, surfer and author
 Christo Hand (1924-2006), Irish Gaelic footballer
 Christo Joubert, South African rugby league player
 Christo Louw, South African rugby league player
 Christo Niewoudt, South African cricketer
 Christo Pimpirev, Bulgarian scientist and explorer
 Christo Proykov (born 1946), Bulgarian Bishop of Sofia
 Christo Steyn (born 1961), South African tennis player
 Christo van Rensburg (born 1962), South African tennis player
 Christo, a fictional character in Disgaea 5

Surname

 Bob Christo (c. 1938–2011), Australian-Indian civil engineer and actor
 Cyril Christo (born 1960), American writer
 Petros Christo (born 1975), heavy metal bass guitarist

See also

 Christ (disambiguation)
 Christa (disambiguation)
 Cristo (disambiguation)
 Christos (disambiguation)
 de Homem-Christo
 Kristo (disambiguation)
 Monte Cristo (disambiguation)